The Prefab People is a 1982 Hungarian black-and-white drama film directed by Béla Tarr. Although the film was made in 1982, it was not shown in Russia until July 4, 2011. The film earned special mention in the 1982 Locarno International Film Festival. The film has several run times (72 min., 84 min., or 102 min. depending on the version), and is shot in 35 mm.

Reception
The Prefab People received generally positive reviews from critics, and has been ranked with Tarr's best early works. Rotten Tomatoes reports a 100% approval rating from critics, based on six reviews, and an average rating of 7.5/10. Writing for Village Voice, Michael Atkinson called the film an "unrelenting, smell-the-sour-breath portrait of a blue-collar marriage dissolving under pressure from Communist-era poverty, masculine inadequacy, and restless depression."

Jonathan Rosenbaum of Chicago Reader argued it was "the best of his early forays into Cassavetes-style social realism." In 2003, web-based film critic Jeremy Heilman called The Prefab People the best of [Tarr's] early works because it achieves such a degree of intimacy that its lack of ostentatious filmmaking never impedes its ability to observe its characters."

References

External links
 
 

Hungarian black-and-white films
1982 films
Films directed by Béla Tarr